Kristian Pieszczek (born 23 September 1995) is a Polish speedway rider.

Career
Born in Gdańsk, Pieszczek first had success as a junior in 2007. He made his Polish league debut in 2011 for Wybrzeże Gdańsk, going on to ride for the club in the Ekstraliga in 2012. He won the Bronze Helmet in 2012 and 2013, and in 2013 was also part of the victorious Polish team in the European Junior Championships. In 2015 he moved to Falubaz Zielona Góra. 

After finishing seventh in 2014, in 2016 he finished runner-up (to Max Fricke) in the World Under-21 Championship, won the Silver Helmet competition, and finished fourth in the Polish Individual Speedway Championship. He was also part of the Polish team that won the 2016 Speedway World Cup.

He rode for GKM Grudziądz in Poland and Lejonen in the Swedish Elitserien in 2017, but after a disappointing season he embarked on an intensive training regime over the winter of 2017/18. 

For the 2018 season he stayed with Grudziądz in Poland and signed for Leicester Lions in the British SGB Premiership.

In 2019, he signed for Ipswich Witches.

References

External links

1995 births
Living people
Polish speedway riders
Ipswich Witches riders
Leicester Lions riders
Sportspeople from Gdańsk